Joseph Romanos (born 1957) is a New Zealand journalist, author and broadcaster focusing mainly on sport.

Life and career
Romanos attended St Patrick's College in Wellington. His father Richie Romanos played cricket for Wellington in the 1951–52 Plunket Shield season.

Romanos has worked on a number of New Zealand newspapers. In 2008 he became editor of The Wellingtonian and in 2012 he also became The Dominion Post's Metro chief reporter. He was the New Zealand Sports Hall of Fame's executive director from 1995 to 1998.

Romanos and his wife Gael Woods have four children. Together with Phil Murray, the couple founded the publishing house Trio Books in 2003.

In October 2016, Romanos joined the Wellington City Council as Chief Advisor to Justin Lester in the Mayor's Office. In January 2017, while driving from Mākara, he and Lester were involved in a crash. All the passengers walked away unhurt, however the Council vehicle they were travelling in was damaged beyond repair.

Books

As sole author
Chris Lewis: All the Way to Wimbledon 1984 
Makers of Champions: Great NZ Coaches 1987 
Famous Fullbacks 1989 
Famous Flankers 1990 
Great New Zealand Cricket Families: A Celebration 1992 
A Century of Great New Zealand Cricketers 1993
Arthur's Boys: The Golden Era of New Zealand Athletics 1994 
Tortured Genius 1995 (on Martin Crowe)
Black 1997 (a novel)
John Reid: A Cricketing Life 2000 
Merv Wallace: A Cricket Master 2000 
Judas Game: The Betrayal of New Zealand Rugby 2002 
Great Sporting Rivals 2004 
Cricket Confidential: The Game's Greatest Players, Matches and Disputes 2005 
New Zealand's Top 100 History-Makers 2005, 2008 
New Zealand's Top 100 Sports History-Makers 2006 
Winning Ways: Champion New Zealand Coaches Reveal Their Secrets 2007 
Our Olympic Century 2008 
Cricket Portraits: A Century of New Zealand's Best 2008 
Long or Short?: The Story of New Zealand Squash 2010
100 Māori Sports Heroes 2012
Unforgettable: Defining Moments in New Zealand Sport 2014

As co-author
100 Great Rugby Characters (with Grant Harding; illustrations by Murray Webb) 1991 
Champions: New Zealand Sports Greats of the 20th Century (with Ron Palenski) 2000
The Basin: An Illustrated History of the Basin Reserve (with Don Neely) 2003 
Lancaster Park: An Illustrated History (with Don Neely) 2006 
No Ordinary Man: The Remarkable Life of Arthur Porritt (with Graeme Woodfield) 2008
Capital People: The Best of the Wellingtonian Interviews (with Rebecca Thomson) 2011

As editor
The Big Black Netball Book (with Gael Woods) 1992 
Sporting Life: The Best of Broadcaster, Peter Sellers 1992 
We Knocked the Bastard Off: Great New Zealand Sports Quotes 1994 
I'm Absolutely Buggered: More Great New Zealand Sports Quotes 1994 
Radio Sport New Zealand Sporting Records & Lists 2001

As collaborator with principal author
Lois Muir on Netball (by Lois Muir) 1985 
Fastbreak (by John Dybvig) 1986
John Dybvig on Basketball (by John Dybvig) 1987
The Innings of a Lifetime (by Walter Hadlee) 1993 
Sandra Edge: Full Circle: An Autobiography (by Sandra Edge) 1995 
Striking Out (by Kevin Herlihy) 1997
Legends of the All Blacks: One: The Book of the Series (by Keith Quinn) 1999 
Outrageous Rugby Moments: Stories of Controversy, Humour, Scandal and Disgrace (by Keith Quinn) 2001 
Outrageous Cricket Moments: The Underhanded, the Undermined, the Underperforming and, of Course, the Underarm (by Ian Smith) 2003

References

External links
 Catalogue at the National Library of New Zealand 
 Trio Books: Joseph Romanos

1957 births
Living people
New Zealand sports historians
New Zealand sportswriters
New Zealand broadcasters
New Zealand journalists
Cricket historians and writers
Rugby historians and writers